Tropidophorus cocincinensis, the Cochinchinese water skink,  is a species of skink found in Thailand, Cambodia, Laos, and Vietnam.

References

cocincinensis
Reptiles of Cambodia
Reptiles of Laos
Reptiles of Thailand
Reptiles of Vietnam
Reptiles described in 1839
Taxa named by André Marie Constant Duméril
Taxa named by Gabriel Bibron